Ian Armstrong (born 16 November 1981) is an English former footballer who played mainly as a winger or an attacking midfielder. He played 101 league and cup games for Port Vale between 2002 and 2005, before injury forced his early retirement, at the age of 23. He also represented England at under-16 and under-18 levels.

Career
After coming through the ranks of the Liverpool academy, he signed for Port Vale in summer 2001. He made his Second Division debut at Vale Park under Brian Horton, in a 4–2 win over Notts County on 11 August 2001. He scored his first goal on 5 October, in a 5–0 win over Cambridge United. He made a total of 34 appearances in his maiden season with the "Valiants", scoring five goals.

He scored eight goals in 34 games in the 2002–03 campaign, including a brace in a 5–1 over Huddersfield Town on 26 April. However a series of injuries dogged his career from the very start, severely reduced his impact in 2003–04, and he was limited to 22 appearances. Injuries continued in the 2004–05 season, though he did find the net three times in his eight League One appearances. His injuries ultimately led to his retirement in 2005, at the age of 23, following an unsuccessful trial with Brian Horton at Macclesfield Town.

Personal life
He attended Lathom High School in Lancashire and is a half-brother to media personality Kerry Katona.

Career statistics

References

1981 births
Living people
Footballers from Liverpool
English footballers
Association football midfielders
Liverpool F.C. players
Port Vale F.C. players
English Football League players